"True Blue" is a song by American singer Madonna from her third studio album of the same name (1986), released as the third single on September 17, 1986, by Sire Records. Written and produced by Madonna and Steve Bray, the song deals with Madonna's feelings for her then-husband Sean Penn. A dance-pop song, it features instrumentation from a rhythm guitar, a synthesizer, keyboards, and drums. The main chorus is backed by an alternate one, incorporating a chord progression generally found in doo-wop music.

Received by critics as a light-hearted and cute retro song, "True Blue" topped the charts in the United Kingdom, Ireland and Canada and became another consecutive top-ten song in United States for Madonna, by reaching number three on the Billboard Hot 100. The original music video portrayed her again with a new look, leaner and sporting platinum blond bushy hair. An alternate video was made through the "Make My Video" contest on MTV. The final selected videos had a similar theme of a 1950s-inspired setting and the storyline following the lyrics of the song. "True Blue" has been performed on the Who's That Girl World Tour (1987) and the Rebel Heart Tour (2015–2016).

Background and writing 

When Madonna had started working on her third studio album, True Blue in 1985, she was already in a relationship with actor Sean Penn whom she married by the year-end. It was the first album that the singer acted in the role of a record producer and wanted to add her own "sophistication" to it. Her optimism assimilated in the songs created, including the title track, which she co-wrote and co-produced the song with Stephen Bray. According to Madonna, "True Blue" takes its title from a favorite expression of Penn and to his very pure vision of love. The song and the album was Madonna's "unabashed valentine" for Penn. In an interview, Bray said, "She [Madonna] was very much in love. It was obvious if she's in love she'll write love songs. If she's not in love she definitely won't be writing love songs." In 2015, Madonna said that "True Blue" is "a song about true love. I didn't know what I was talking about when I wrote it."

Composition and lyrics 

"True Blue" is a dance-pop song which was musically inspired by the Motown's girl groups from the 1960s which are considered the direct antecedents of Madonna's musical sound, and the music she had grown up in her hometown Detroit. The song is composed in the key of B major. It is set in compound quadruple meter, commonly used in doo-wop, and has a moderate tempo of 118 beats per minute. "True Blue" features instrumentation from a rhythm guitar, a synthesizer, keyboards, and drums for the bassline, with a basic sequence of I–vi–IV–V (B–Gm–E–F) as its main chord progression.

Madonna's vocal range spans a bit less than one and a half octaves, from F3 to B4. The chorus is backed by sounds of bells ringing, an alternate verse—"This time I know it's true"— which is sung by three back-up singers during the interlude, and a bass counter melody which introduces her vocals during the second chorus. The lyrics are constructed in a verse-chorus form, with the theme being Madonna's feelings for Penn; it uses the archaic love word "dear" in the line "Just think back and remember, dear". According to author Lucy O'Brien, who wrote in her biography Madonna: Like an Icon, the verse-and-chorus composition was reminiscent of The Dixie Cups' 1964 single "Chapel of Love", with backup singers Siedah Garrett and Edie Lehman accompanying Madonna's convincing "girly" vocals like a choir.

Critical response 

Davitt Sigerson from Rolling Stone said that the song "squanders a classic beat and an immensely promising title", In his book Madonna: An Intimate Biography, journalist J. Randy Taraborrelli described the song as "the light-hearted, fun track of the whole True Blue album project having a retro 1950's feel to it". In the book Rock 'n' Roll Gold Rush, author Maury Dean said that the song as a "masterwork of simplicity interwoven with secret complexity" adding that "on one hand, it's just a basic Streetcorner ditty, with four basic chords. In another context, it's a counterpoint harmonic blanket, twirling with star-spangled timbre and dynamic drive." Rikky Rooksby, in his book The Complete Guide to the Music of Madonna, said that "True Blue" is "a saccharine uptempo version of 'Shoo-Bee-Do' (from Like a Virgin) with telegraphed rhymes... [Its] a song that is merely cute and not really up to being the title track of an album". O'Brien relegated the track as a "ditty" which contained "schmaltzy nostalgia" with Madonna's convincing vocals making it contemporary.

A reviewer for The Wichita Eagle did not like the track, believing that it was "sassless and neutered" as compared to the other songs on the record. However, Daniel Brogan of the Chicago Tribune believed the song was good, calling it "impressive" like the rest of the album, and Jan DeKnock of the same paper believed it was "charming". Steve Morse of The Boston Globe, when describing the song, said that it was a "bid to be an '80s Helen of Troy". Sal Cinquemani from Slant Magazine called it as an "authentic throwback to the girl-group-era pop". AllMusic's Stephen Thomas Erlewine felt that "True Blue" was Madonna's "real trick" to keep her status as a "dance-pop diva" and recalled the classic pop girl influence.

Writing for Stuff.co.nz website, James Croot listed the track as the "crowning glory" on the album, describing it as a "toe-tapping 1950s-inspired ditty, it is simply pop-song confection perfection". Terry Hearn from The Metropolist opined that calling "True Blue" as "dated and simplistic" did not consider that the song was made for a particular musical genre. She compared Madonna's vocals with that of songs by The Supremes and 1950–60s standards. Hearn ended by saying, "Understandably, hearing this from the woman who was singing Like a Virgin a year earlier could be disorienting, but what a feat it is to shock people by being so simple and pure. It represents a clever inversion of what is expected from pop music stars." Larry Bartleet from NME ranked it as one of Madonna's best singles, describing the track as having "an upbeat pop melody and crushing lyrics about love gone wrong".

Chart performance 
"True Blue" was released in the United States in October 1986. It debuted on the Billboard Hot 100 at number 40, six weeks later it reached its peak of number three, remaining at the position for three consecutive weeks, and spent a total of 16 weeks on the chart. The song performed equally well on the other Billboard charts, peaking at number five on Adult Contemporary, and number six on the Hot Dance Club Songs chart. In October 1998, the single was certified gold by the Recording Industry Association of America (RIAA) for shipment of 500,000 copies. In Canada, the song debuted at number 84 the RPM singles chart on September 27, 1986, reached the top for one week in November 1986, and stayed on the chart for 23 weeks. It ended at number 37 on the year-end chart.

In the United Kingdom, "True Blue" was released on September 29, 1986. It debuted at number three on the UK Singles Chart, before climbing to number one the next week, becoming Madonna's third number-one single there. It was certified gold by the British Phonographic Industry (BPI) in October 1986. According to the Official Charts Company, the song has sold 557,000 copies there as of August 2016. The song peaked at number one for two weeks in October 1986 in Ireland, making it her fourth number-one single on the Irish Singles Chart. In Australia, New Zealand and South Africa, the song reached the top five, and was certified platinum in the former region by the Australian Recording Industry Association (ARIA) for sales of 70,000 copies of the single. In Europe "True Blue" also topped the Eurochart Hot 100 for one week in October 1986. It peaked in the top five in Belgium and the Netherlands, and in the top ten in Austria, France, Germany, and Switzerland.

Music videos

Official version 

"True Blue" had two music videos to accompany it. Shot in early September 1986 in New York City, Madonna's own video for the song was directed by James Foley, who worked with Madonna in her videos for "Live to Tell" and "Papa Don't Preach", produced by Robert Colesberry and David Massar with photography by Michael Ballhaus. The Foley version features Madonna with three dancers and a 1950s car in an all-blue diner. Madonna changes her hairstyle from short-cropped in "Papa Don't Preach" to a bouffant platinum blonde hairdo and sings the song in choreographed moves backed by her dancers. It displays a flashing back to 1950s rock'n'roll youth culture.

The blue background changes to a sunny one as she sings "The sun is bursting right out of the sky" to go along with the lyrical meaning of the song. Two of Madonna's close friends, Erika Belle and Debi Mazar, appear in the video. The video was released at a time when she was going through a failed marriage with then-husband actor Sean Penn. During this period, Madonna focused on more traditional fashion and attitudes and tried to appear more respectful of traditional gender roles. After shedding her sex-kitten and boy-toy image with the "Live to Tell" music video, Madonna again adopted a new look for this video. Madonna attended aerobics classes at the Hollywood health centre The Sports Connection, which was responsible for her toned-down look in the video.

"Make My Video" contest 
Sire Records decided to opt for a promotional device in the United States that would involve MTV viewers to make their own videos for "True Blue". In the fall of 1986, MTV asked its viewers to submit their own videos. The contest was known as "Madonna's 'Make My Video' Contest". The winner was awarded a trip to MTV's New York studio where Madonna presented a $25,000 check live on MTV. Thousands of viewers submitted their recorded tapes which were mainly made using home-made video equipment and featured themselves or relatives as the actors. MTV publicist Peter Danielson said that many of the submissions featured teenagers imitating Madonna. All the entries were shown in a continuous run on MTV as promised. The same song was played over and over for the whole day, but each time with a different video made by the finalists. Author Lisa A. Lewis said that this event emphasized the effect Madonna had on different kind of audiences due to the popularity and response to the contest. MTV selected ten finalists based mainly on a standard of popularity rather than slickness of production or concept creativity.

The concepts used in the videos were wide-ranging and included a number of different ideas to interpret the lyrical meaning of the song. The final three entries selected, portrayed a fifties-style production referring to the thematic content of the song. The song's narration  about "True Love" formed the basis of the rest of the semi-finalist videos but was used in very different ways. The videos were choreographed featuring heterosexual romance, though no particular male or female protagonist was singled out. Some even adopted a kind of literal montage technique rather than structuring the video around a narrative line.

The winning entry was by Angel Gracia and Cliff Guest who had filmed the video for under US$1,000 and were awarded a cash prize of US$25,000. The clip showed the female protagonist (played by the director's sister Anabel Gracia) being supported and guided by her girlfriends who introduce her with the male protagonist. The girl even goes to the boy's door to gift him flowers, thereby reversing the usual gender-directed pattern of gift-giving. The male protagonist is portrayed as a "perfect boy" (played by William Fitzgibbon) having the sensibilities like attentiveness, cuteness, playfulness like a friend (after the lyrics "You're my best friend") and not sexual overtones. The video in-turn contrasts him with a self-centered boy who puts on sunglasses, throws his leather jacket over his shoulder and walks away from the girl. Other videos portrayed a girl pining for her sailor, US-Soviet relations and an arguing couple with the girl in a scene inspired by the music video of Tina Turner's 1984 single "What's Love Got to Do with It".

Live performances 

Madonna first performed the song on her 1987 Who's That Girl World Tour. After finishing a performance of "Lucky Star", she came up on the stage wearing a blue silk dress to sing the song. Set in a similar setting to the song's music video, Madonna was backed up by her singers who played the role of her girlfriends. At the end of the song, a male dancer asks her to dance. This number, along with many others on the tour, was choreographed by Jeffrey Hornaday, who had worked on the 1983 film Flashdance. Two different performances of the song on the tour were included on two live video releases: Who's That Girl: Live in Japan, filmed in Tokyo, Japan, on June 22, 1987, and Ciao Italia: Live from Italy, filmed in Turin, Italy, on September 4, 1987.

Madonna did not perform the song again until 2015–16 as part of her Rebel Heart Tour. She performed an acoustic, ukulele-driven version of the song sitting on top of a tire stack while asking the crowd to sing along with her. Writing for the Daily News, Jim Farber felt that during the performance "[Madonna] emphasized a rare sincerity" while Jordan Zivitz from the Montreal Gazette opined that "it was both endearingly quaint and, supersized by an unprompted singalong from more than 16,000 voices, a goosebumps moment that felt more grandiose in its way than the showpieces surrounding it". Newsdays Glenn Gamboa gave a similar feedback, saying that the "lovely acoustic version of "True Blue" was a rare bow to romance, the sweetest of Madonna sentiments". The performance of the song at the March 19–20, 2016 shows in Sydney's Allphones Arena was recorded and released in Madonna's fifth live album, Rebel Heart Tour.

Formats and track listing 

7" single (Europe)
"True Blue" (Remix/Edit) – 4:22
"Holiday" (7" Edit) – 3:50

7" single (US)
"True Blue" (LP Version) – 4:16
"Ain't No Big Deal" (Non-LP Track) – 4:12

7" single (Japan)
"True Blue" (Radio Edit) – 4:09
"Ain't No Big Deal" (Non-LP Track) – 4:12

7" single (Re-Issue)
"True Blue" (LP Version) – 4:16
"Live to Tell (7" Edit)" – 4:37

12" single (UK)
"True Blue" (Extended Dance Version) – 6:37
"Holiday" (Full Length Version) – 6:08

12" Maxi-Single (US)
"True Blue" (The Color Mix) – 6:37
"True Blue" (Instrumental) – 6:56
"Ain't No Big Deal" (Non-LP Track) – 4:12
"True Blue (Remix/Edit) – 4:22

Germany / UK Reissue CD Maxi-Single (1995)
"True Blue" (The Color Mix) – 6:37
"Holiday" (LP Version) – 6:10CD Super Club Mix (Australia/Japan) (1992)'''
"True Blue" (The Color Mix) – 6:37
"Everybody" (Dub Version) – 9:23
"Papa Don't Preach" (Extended Remix) – 5:45
"Everybody" (Extended Version) – 5:56
"Live to Tell" (Instrumental Version) – 5:49

Credits and personnel 
Madonna – lyrics, producer, vocals
Steve Bray – drums, keyboard, lyrics, producer
Bruce Gaitsch – rhythm guitar
Fred Zarr – additional keyboard
Steve Peck – engineer
Shep Pettibone – remixing
Herb Ritts – photography
Jeri McManus – design/artwork

Credits adapted from the album's liner notes.

Charts

Weekly charts

Year-end chart

Certifications and sales

See also 
List of number-one singles of 1986 (Canada)
List of European number-one hits of 1986
List of number-one singles of 1986 (Ireland)
List of UK Singles Chart number ones of the 1980s

References

Bibliography 

1986 songs
1986 singles
European Hot 100 Singles number-one singles
Irish Singles Chart number-one singles
Madonna songs
RPM Top Singles number-one singles
Songs written by Madonna
Songs written by Stephen Bray
Song recordings produced by Madonna
Song recordings produced by Stephen Bray
UK Singles Chart number-one singles